Moeed W. Yusuf is a Pakistani national security scholar who served as the 9th National Security Adviser to the Prime Minister of Pakistan. Previously he served in the capacity of a Special Assistant to the Prime Minister of Pakistan on National Security Division and Strategic Policy Planning from 24 December 2019 to 16 May 2021.

Before joining the government, Yusuf was the Associate Vice President for Asia at the Institute of Peace in Washington, D.C. and previously a Fellow at the Frederick S. Pardee Center for the Study of the Longer-Range Future at the Pardee School of Global Studies at Boston University, and a Research Fellow at the Mossavar-Rahmani Center at Harvard University's Kennedy School.

Yusuf has taught Political Science/International Relations at Boston University, George Washington University, the Lahore University of Management Sciences, and the Quaid-e-Azam University.

Education
He holds Bachelor of Business Administration from Shorter College; Masters and Doctor of Philosophy degrees from Boston University.

Career
On 25 September 2019, he was appointed as Chairperson of Pakistan's Strategic Policy Planning Cell under National Security Division for a two-year period.

On 24 December 2019, he was appointed as the Special Assistant to the Prime Minister of Pakistan on National Security Division and Strategic Policy Planning.

Yusuf served as the associate vice president at the Asia Center at the United States Institute of Peace.

Books 
 Brokering Peace in Nuclear Environments: US Crisis Management in South Asia (2018)
Pakistan's Counter-terrorism Challenge (Editor) (2014)
Insurgency and Counterinsurgency in South Asia: From a Peacebuilding Lens (Editor) (2014)
South Asia 2060: Envisioning Regional Futures (co-edited) (2013)
Getting it Right in Afghanistan (co-edited) (2013)

References

Living people
Imran Khan administration
Boston University alumni
Pakistani columnists
Academic staff of Quaid-i-Azam University
Year of birth missing (living people)
Pakistani government officials
Pakistani political commentators
Pakistani economists
Political economists
Pakistani emigrants to the United States